The U.S. Smelting and Lead Refinery Inc. site, commonly known as USS Lead, is a superfund site located in East Chicago, which is located in northwest Indiana. The site includes part of the former USS Lead facility along with nearby commercial, municipal, and residential areas. Originally the site was used as a lead ore refinery with the surrounding businesses at the time performing similar operations The primary contaminants of concern for this area are lead and arsenic. The site is currently undergoing testing and remediation. This Superfund site is broken down into two Operable Units. The first, OU1, has been divided into three zones, these being public housing complex and residential properties. OU2 includes soil at the former USS Lead facility, as well as groundwater in and around the site.

Location 
The site includes part of the former USS Lead facility along with nearby commercial, municipal, and residential areas. The site is made up of two areas called "operable units" (OU). Operable units are broken down based on how the land was used, in this case OU1 is residential and OU2 was industrial. OU1, is a 322-acre residential area that has East Chicago Avenue on the north, East 151st Street on the south, the Indiana Harbor Canal on the west and Parrish Avenue on the east. OU2 is the former USS Lead facility on 151st Street.

At this time the EPA has not begun remediation on OU2, but has come to an agreement with the company to perform a remedial investigation and feasibility study.

Products 
The USS Lead site began as a facility that processed and refined metals and chemicals, including lead and arsenic, which are now the primary contaminants of concern for the area. Then the site was converted to a secondary smelter; where the facility began recovering lead from scrap metal and automotive batteries. The site had been owned by other similar companies prior to this that performed the same type of industrial work.

Types of contaminants 
There are two primary contaminants on the site, those contaminants are lead and arsenic. These contaminants are widespread across the area and are found in the soil and groundwater. Exposure to these can cause a series of health related issues, especially in children due to their size and that they are still developing.

Hazards 
Arsenic: Arsenic affects numerous organs and systems including- Skin, nervous system, respiratory system, cardiovascular system, liver, kidney, bladder and prostate, immune system, endocrine system, developmental processes, and even death.

Lead: Chronic lead exposure can result in- increased blood pressure, decreased fertility, cataracts, nerve disorders, muscle and joint pain, memory or concentration problems, and developmental disorders in children. There are no safe levels of lead

Remediation efforts 
The remediation starts with taking sample of the soil and ground water, from there workers will dig up and remove contaminated soil, about 2-feet deep, and replace it with clean soil, including 6 inches of topsoil. Then they will put sod on the clean soil. The soil will then be taken to a licensed landfill for proper disposal. The sites will then be monitored for additional hazards. All work will be done at no cost to the homeowner.

The current status of the remediation is still underway, due to the size and other limitations such as weather it is unknown when the site will be completely remediated.

References 

Superfund sites in  Indiana